The 2018 Braga Open was a professional tennis tournament played on clay courts. It was the 1st edition of the tournament which was part of the 2018 ATP Challenger Tour. It took place in Braga, Portugal between 7 and 13 May 2018.

Singles main-draw entrants

Seeds

 1 Rankings are as of 30 April 2018.

Other entrants
The following players received wildcards into the singles main draw:
  Francisco Cabral
  Tiago Cação
  Frederico Ferreira Silva
  Fred Gil

The following players received entry from the qualifying draw:
  Evan Furness
  Germain Gigounon
  Jan Šátral
  David Vega Hernández

Champions

Singles
 
 Pedro Sousa def.  Casper Ruud 6–0, 3–6, 6–3.

Doubles

 Sander Arends /  Adil Shamasdin def.  Ariel Behar /  Miguel Ángel Reyes-Varela 6–2, 6–1.

References

2018 ATP Challenger Tour
2018 in Portuguese tennis